227 (two hundred [and] twenty-seven) is the natural number between 226 and 228. It is also a prime number.

In mathematics
227 is a twin prime and the start of a prime triplet (with 229 and 233). It is a safe prime, as dividing it by two and rounding down produces the Sophie Germain prime 113. It is also a regular prime, a Pillai prime, a Stern prime, and a Ramanujan prime.

227 and 229 form the first twin prime pair for which neither is a cluster prime.

The 227th harmonic number is the first to exceed six. There are 227 different connected graphs with eight edges, and 227 independent sets in a 3 × 4 grid graph.

References

Integers